Zoran Jovanović  (born May 25, 1965) is a Serbian former professional basketball player who last played for Enpol Pogon.

See also
List of European basketball players in the United States

References

External links
 Profile at FIBA Europe

1965 births
Living people
Basketball players from Belgrade
BKK Radnički players
CB Zaragoza players
Centers (basketball)
Competitors at the 1983 Mediterranean Games
FIBA World Championship-winning players
KK Budućnost players
KK Crvena zvezda players
KK Vojvodina players
LSU Tigers basketball players
Mediterranean Games gold medalists for Yugoslavia
Mediterranean Games medalists in basketball
OKK Beograd players
Serbian expatriate basketball people in Montenegro
Serbian expatriate basketball people in North Macedonia
Serbian expatriate basketball people in Poland
Serbian expatriate basketball people in Spain
Serbian expatriate basketball people in the United States
Serbian men's basketball players
Śląsk Wrocław basketball players
Yugoslav men's basketball players
1990 FIBA World Championship players